Kilbrittain GAA is a Gaelic Athletic Association club based in the parish of Kilbrittain, County Cork, Ireland. The club fields teams in Gaelic football and Hurling, but is primarily known for hurling. The club participates in Cork GAA competitions. The club is a member of Carbery division of Cork GAA.

History
Kilbrittain GAA club was founded in 1904. It has been primarily a hurling club throughout its history, though it did play in the Cork Junior Football Championship final in 1926. Hurling has always been the first sport in the parish. From the beginning, especially in the 1920s, the club had some successes in the South-West division, winning 6 titles in a row and again in 1930, 1938, 1940, 1941 and 1942. In 1978, after a lapse of 36 years, the club won the Flyer Nyhan Cup or the South-West Junior Hurling Championship. The club were beaten by Kinsale in the subsequent Cork Junior Hurling Championship. 

In 1984, Kilbrittain reached the final of the Cork Junior Hurling Championship only to be defeated by Midleton. The following year, 1985, Kilbrittain defeated Cobh in the final to win its first county title in 81 years. 

In 1994, the Carbery divisional team won the Cork Senior Hurling Championship title with a number of Kilbrittain players on the team, 5 playing on the team with 2 subs.

After competing 10 years in the Intermediate grade and being runners up in 3 county finals (1988, 1989, 1993) Kilbrittain won the Cork Intermediate Hurling Championship in 1995. In 1996, Kilbrittain became a senior hurling club. In 2010 Kilbrittain won the Cork County intermediate A hurling championship.

Achievements
 Cork Intermediate Hurling Championship Winners (1) 1995  Runners-Up 1988, 1989, 1993
 Cork Intermediate A Hurling Championship Winners (1) 2010
 Cork Lower Intermediate Hurling championship Runners-Up 2021
 Cork Junior Hurling Championship Winners (1) 1985  Runners-Up 1927, 1984
 Cork Junior Football Championship Runners-Up 1926
 Cork Junior B Football Championship Winners (2) 1992, 2009
 Cork Junior B Inter-Divisional Football Championship Winners 2016
 Cork Minor A Hurling Championship Winners (1) 1992 (As Seaside Rovers)
 Cork Minor C Football Championship Winners (1) 2008
 South West Junior A Hurling Championship Winners (12) 1925, 1926, 1927, 1928, 1930, 1938, 1940, 1941, 1942, 1978, 1984, 1985  Runners-Up 1929, 1931, 1933, 1939, 1957, 1959, 1965, 1973, 1976, 1977, 1981, 1982, 2005
 South West Junior A Football Championship (1): 1926 Runners-Up 1993, 2017
 South West Junior B Hurling Championship Winners (4) 1946, 1951, 1958, 1967, 2021
 South West Junior B Football Championship Winners (2) 1970, 1992, 2009, 2016  Runners-Up 1969, 1991, 2008, 
 South West Junior C Hurling Championship Winners (2) 1983, 1993, 2010 Runners-Up 1984, 2002, 2003, 2004
 South West Junior D Football Championship Winners (4) 1982, 1984, 1987, 2003  Runners-Up 1986, 1988
 West Cork Minor A Hurling Championship Winners (5) 1981, 1982, 1992 (As Seaside Rovers), 2002, 2006  Runners-Up 1960, 1996, 1997, 1998, 2001, 2003, 2005, 2007, 2009, 2016, 2020
 West Cork Minor B Hurling Championship Winners (1) 1981 (As Seaside Rovers)
 West Cork Minor B Football Championship Winners (1) 1993 (As Seaside Rovers) 2017 Runners-Up 1998, 2004, 
 West Cork Minor C Football Championship Winners (1) 2008
 West Cork Under-21 A Hurling Championship Winners (8) 1979, 1983, 1984, 1986, 2001, 2004, 2007, 2011  Runners-Up 1975, 1982, 1987, 1992, 1994, 1997, 1999, 2002, 2006, 2008, 2011
 West Cork Under 21 B Hurling Championship Winners (1) 2021 
 West Cork Under-21 B Football Championship Winners (1) 2011   Runners-Up 1986, 2002
 West Cork Under-21 C Football Championship Winners (1) 2014

Notable players
 Owen Sexton, Cork Minor Football All-Ireland winner 1993, Cork U21 and senior footballer from 1996 to 2006. Captained Cork in 2005. County Senior Football winner with Carbery in 2004. Captain of Kilbrittain Junior B Football County winners in 2009, Intermediate hurling county winner in 2010.
 Dan O'Connell
 Jamie Wall

References

External sources
 Kilbrittain GAA website

Gaelic games clubs in County Cork
Hurling clubs in County Cork
Gaelic football clubs in County Cork